, known professionally as , is a Japanese singer-songwriter. He dropped out from Shobi University. He is represented by Avex Vanguard.

Discography

Singles

Unreleased

Others

Tie-ups

Filmography

Radio

TV series

TV drama

Stage

Films

References

External links
 

Japanese male singer-songwriters
Japanese singer-songwriters
Japanese radio personalities
1985 births
Living people
Singers from Tokyo
Avex Group artists
21st-century Japanese singers
21st-century Japanese male singers